Jadid may refer to:
 Jadid, Fars
 Jadid, Khuzestan

See also
 Jadid, meaning "New", is a common element in Iranian place names; see .